Taboga is a district (distrito) of Panamá Province in Panama. The population according to the 2000 census was 1,402; the latest official estimate (for 2019) is 1,387. The capital lies at the town of Taboga.

Taboga is an island district that includes the islands of Taboga, Taboguilla, Otoque, Urabá, Melones, Chamá, and Estivá.

It was the home of Francisco Pizarro, where he built boats for his conquest of the Incas in 1539.

Administrative divisions
Taboga District is divided administratively into the following corregimientos:

Taboga (capital)
Otoque Occidente
Otoque Oriente

References

Districts of Panamá Province